Duets is a compilation album by Linda Ronstadt.  It was released on the Rhino Records label in April 2014, a few days before Ronstadt's induction into the Rock & Roll Hall of Fame.  

The album peaked at number 32 on the Billboard album chart - Ronstadt's highest charting album in 24 years. The songs on the album were all previously released with the exception of "Pretty Bird", a duet with bluegrass singer Laurie Lewis. In his review for AllMusic critic Stephen Thomas Erlewine states that "generally, this Duets emphasizes the sweeter, softer, and slower side of Ronstadt, a move that makes for pleasant listening".

Track listing

References

2014 compilation albums
Rhino Records compilation albums
Linda Ronstadt compilation albums